Marlborough Rugby Union was a New Zealand rugby union team that played from 1888 until 2005.

Marlborough was founded in 1888 and played at Lansdowne Park in Blenheim.

Championships
Marlborough won three New Zealand Championships during the old NPC, consecutive South Island Division with two titles in 1978 and 1979, and Division 3 in 1997.

Ranfurly Shield
Marlborough held the Ranfurly Shield briefly in the early 1970s which they won against Canterbury in 1973. They managed six defences before losing to South Canterbury, in the second challenge of 1974. Their last challenge came in the first challenge of the 2005 season, however Marlborough could not match Canterbury's strength this time and lost heavily, 3–67.

Hong Kong Sevens
Marlborough reached the final of the 1977 Hong Kong Sevens, finishing runner-up, losing 18–28 to Fiji.

Tasman
Marlborough joined with Nelson Bays Rugby Union to become Tasman Rugby Union in 2006.

Rugby clubs established in 1888
Defunct New Zealand rugby union teams
Defunct New Zealand rugby union governing bodies
Sport in the Marlborough Region
1888 establishments in New Zealand